Mitchell Park railway station is located on the Flinders line. Situated in the south-western Adelaide suburb of Mitchell Park, it is 11.5 kilometres from Adelaide station.

History 

Mitchell Park station was opened in 1966. Since its opening, there have been no significant modifications to the station, besides paintwork or the addition of a newer speaker system.

Services by platform

See also 
 List of Adelaide railway stations
 Adelaide Metro

References

External links

Railway stations in Adelaide
Railway stations in Australia opened in 1966